T. grandiflora  may refer to:
 Tellima grandiflora, the fringecup or bigflower tellima, a herbaceous perennial plant species native of most forests in western North America
 Thespesia grandiflora, the flor de Maga, a tree species and the official national flower of Puerto Rico
 Thomasia grandiflora, the large-flowered thomasia, a small shrub species endemic to the southwest of Western Australia
 Tibouchina grandiflora, a synonym of the flowering plant species Pleroma heteromallum

See also
 Grandiflora (disambiguation)